R335 road may refer to:
 R335 road (Ireland)
 R335 road (South Africa)